The 47th Primetime Emmy Awards were held on Sunday, September 10, 1995. The ceremony was hosted by Jason Alexander and Cybill Shepherd. It was broadcast on Fox.

Frasier won its second consecutive Primetime Emmy Award for Outstanding Comedy Series and led all shows with five major wins. For the second straight year, a freshman drama series came into the ceremony with a bevy of major nominations, but failed to win for Outstanding Drama Series. ER led all shows with 11 major nominations and won three major awards, but lost the top prize to NYPD Blue, which was in a similar situation to ER the previous year.

Candice Bergen's win for the seventh season of Murphy Brown made her the third performer to win five Emmys for playing the same character. She declined to be submitted for any future seasons of the show.

Marvin Hamlisch's win made him the sixth person to become an EGOT.

Winners and nominees

Programs

Acting

Lead performances

Supporting performances

Guest performances

Directing

Writing

Most major nominations
By network 
 NBC – 56
 CBS – 32
 HBO – 27
 ABC – 20

By program
 ER (NBC) – 11
 Frasier (NBC) / NYPD Blue (ABC) – 9
 The Burning Season (HBO) / Friends (NBC) / Indictment: The McMartin Trial (HBO) / The Larry Sanders Show (HBO) / Seinfeld (NBC) – 6

Most major awards
By network 
 NBC – 14
 HBO – 7
 CBS – 6
 ABC – 3

By program
 Frasier (NBC) – 5
 ER (NBC) / Picket Fences (CBS) / Serving in Silence: The Margarethe Cammermeyer Story (NBC) – 3

Notes

References

External links
 Emmys.com list of 1995 Nominees & Winners
 

047
Primetime Emmy Awards
1995 in California
September 1995 events in the United States
Events in Pasadena, California
20th century in Pasadena, California